Michal Farkaš (born 10 March 1985) is a Slovak football coach and a former player. He is the director of sports for the Under-19 squad of Polish club Zagłębie Sosnowiec.

Career
In July 2011, he joined GKS Katowice.

References

External links
 
 Guardian Football

1985 births
People from Zlaté Moravce
Sportspeople from the Nitra Region
Living people
Slovak footballers
Association football defenders
FC Nitra players
FK Jablonec players
Ruch Radzionków players
GKS Katowice players
Zagłębie Sosnowiec players
Odra Wodzisław Śląski players
Slovak Super Liga players
Czech First League players
I liga players
II liga players
Slovak expatriate footballers
Slovak expatriate sportspeople in the Czech Republic
Expatriate footballers in the Czech Republic
Slovak expatriate sportspeople in Poland
Expatriate footballers in Poland
Slovak football managers
Zagłębie Sosnowiec managers
Slovak expatriate football managers
Expatriate football managers in Poland